Piñeros de Loma Bonita is a Mexican football club that plays in group 2 in the Tercera División de México. The club is based in  Loma Bonita, Mexico .

See also
Football in Mexico

External links
official Page

Football clubs in Oaxaca
Association football clubs established in 2000
2000 establishments in Mexico